Scyphosyce is a genus of flowering plants belonging to the family Moraceae.

Its native range is Niger to Western Central Tropical Africa.

Species
Species:

Scyphosyce gilletii 
Scyphosyce manniana 
Scyphosyce pandurata

References

Moraceae
Moraceae genera